Morris E. "Red" Jones (November 2, 1911 – June 30, 1974) was a professional baseball player.  He was an outfielder for one season (1940) with the St. Louis Cardinals.  For his career, he compiled a .091 batting average in 11 at-bats, with one run batted in.

He was born in Timpson, Texas and he died in Lincoln, California at the age of 62.

External links

1911 births
1974 deaths
People from Timpson, Texas
St. Louis Cardinals players
Major League Baseball outfielders
Baseball players from Texas
Minor league baseball managers
Springfield Senators players
Beaumont Exporters players
Augusta Tigers players
Tulsa Oilers (baseball) players
Binghamton Triplets players
Jersey City Giants players
Columbus Red Birds players
Vicksburg Billies players
Birmingham Barons players
Lufkin Foresters players
Marshall Tigers players
Marshall Browns players